Cyperus stradbrokensis is a species of sedge that is native to north eastern parts of Australia.

See also 
 List of Cyperus species

References 

stradbrokensis
Plants described in 1915
Flora of Queensland
Flora of New South Wales
Taxa named by Karel Domin